Bird's-eye primrose is a common name for several plants and may refer to:

Primula farinosa, native to northern Europe and Asia
Primula mistassinica, native to North America